Slavko Damjanović (born 2 November 1992) is a Montenegrin professional footballer who plays as a centre-back for Indian Super League club ATK Mohun Bagan.

Club career
Born in Nikšić, Montenegro, back then within FR Yugoslavia, Slavko Damjanović played with Montenegrin clubs FK Čelik Nikšić, FK Mogren, FK Sutjeska Nikšić and FK Mornar, before moving to Serbia and playing with FK Spartak Subotica and FK Bačka 1901. In summer 2015, he moved to Hungary and played with Békéscsaba 1912 Előre the entire season 2015–16 Nemzeti Bajnokság I. They finished the season 12th and ended relegated, thus Damjanović left Békéscsaba and returned to Montenegro where he signed with his former club FK Sutjeska Nikšić.

He was announced to have signed for South African club Bidvest Wits F.C. early July 2017 as a free agent, playing in the South African Premier Division. He then returned to Montenegro with Budućnost Podgorica before playing for Budućnost Podgorica of the Uzbekistan Super League and Serbian SuperLiga club Bačka Topola.

He was announced as new signing of the Indian Super League club Chennaiyin on 5 August 2021, where he is said to have penned a one-year deal.

In December 2022, Damjanović returned to India to sign for ATK Mohun Bagan following a short spell back in Serbia with Novi Pazar.

Honours
Sutjeska
Montenegrin Cup: 2017

Bidvest Wits
Telkom Knockout: 2017

Budućnost
Montenegrin Cup: 2019

ATK Mohun Bagan
Indian Super League: 2022–23

References

External links
 
 
 

1992 births
Living people
Footballers from Nikšić
Association football central defenders
Montenegrin footballers
FK Čelik Nikšić players
FK Mogren players
FK Sutjeska Nikšić players
FK Mornar players
FK Budućnost Podgorica players
FK Spartak Subotica players
FK Bačka 1901 players
Békéscsaba 1912 Előre footballers
Bidvest Wits F.C. players
PFC Lokomotiv Tashkent players
FK TSC Bačka Topola players
Chennaiyin FC players
FK Novi Pazar players
ATK Mohun Bagan FC players
Montenegrin Second League players
Montenegrin First League players
Serbian First League players
Nemzeti Bajnokság I players
South African Premier Division players
Uzbekistan Super League players
Serbian SuperLiga players
Indian Super League players
Montenegrin expatriate footballers
Expatriate footballers in Serbia
Montenegrin expatriate sportspeople in Serbia
Expatriate footballers in Hungary
Montenegrin expatriate sportspeople in Hungary
Expatriate soccer players in South Africa
Expatriate footballers in Uzbekistan
Montenegrin expatriate sportspeople in Uzbekistan
Montenegrin expatriate sportspeople in India
Expatriate footballers in India